Wilfredo Galeano Genes (born July 7, 1985) is a Paraguayan footballer who has played for Bontang FC in the Indonesia Super League.

References

1985 births
Association football defenders
Paraguayan expatriate footballers
Paraguayan expatriate sportspeople in Indonesia
Paraguayan footballers
Expatriate footballers in Indonesia
Liga 1 (Indonesia) players
Indonesian Premier Division players
Living people
PSIM Yogyakarta players
Bontang F.C. players